Belarus competed at the 2022 Winter Olympics in Beijing, China, from 4 to 20 February 2022.

Speed skaters Ignat Golovatsiuk and Hanna Nifantava were the country's flagbearer during the opening ceremony. Golovatsiuk was also the flagbearer during the closing ceremony.

Competitors
The following is a list of the number of competitors who participated at the Games per sport/discipline.

Medalists 

The following Belarus competitors won medals at the games. In the discipline sections below, the medalists' names are bolded.

Alpine skiing

By meeting the basic qualification standards Belarus qualified one male and one female alpine skier, but chose to only use their female quota.

Biathlon

Based on their Nations Cup rankings in the 2020–21 Biathlon World Cup and 2021–22 Biathlon World Cup, Belarus has qualified a team of 4 men and 4 women.

Men

Women

Mixed

Cross-country skiing

Belarus qualified two male and two female cross-country skiers.

Distance

Sprint

Figure skating

In the 2021 World Figure Skating Championships in Stockholm, Sweden, Belarus secured one quota in the men's singles competition.

Freestyle skiing

Belarus qualified 3 men and 3 women.

Aerials

Speed skating

Belarus qualified 1 man and 4 women.

Distance

Mass start

Team pursuit

References

Nations at the 2022 Winter Olympics
2022
Winter Olympics